Yang Aiyuan (楊愛源) (1886 – 2 January 1959) was a KMT general from Shanxi. From 1928 to 1930, Yang was the first chairman of the government of Chahar, a newly formed province of the Republic of China. In 1937, as a general of the KMT, he played an active part in the Battle of Taiyuan and the Battle of Xinkou. He died in 1959 in Taiwan.

References
Yang Aiyuan at Rulers.org
Chinese administrative divisions at Rulers.org

National Revolutionary Army generals from Shanxi
People of the Northern Expedition
1886 births
1959 deaths
People from Xinzhou